The Cabinet Secretariat (IAST: Mantrimanḍala Sacivālaya) is responsible for the administration of the Government of India. It functions from the Secretariat Building, New Delhi, where most of the Cabinet of India sits. It comprises a set of two buildings on opposite sides of Kartavya Path which are home to some of the most important ministries of the Government of India, situated on Raisina Hill, New Delhi, India.

Overview

The Cabinet Secretariat is responsible for the administration of the Government of India (Transaction of Business) Rules, 1961 and the Government of India (Allocation of Business) Rules 1961, facilitating a smooth transaction of business in Ministries/ Departments of the Government by ensuring adherence to these rules. The Secretariat assists in decision-making in Government by ensuring Inter-Ministerial coordination, ironing out differences amongst Ministries/ Departments and evolving consensus through the instrumentality of the standing/ad hoc Committees of Secretaries. Through this mechanism new policy initiatives are also promoted.

The Secretariat Building houses the following ministries:
 Ministry of Defence (MoD)
 Ministry of Finance (MoF)
 Ministry of External Affairs (MEA)
 Ministry of Home Affairs (MHA)
 Prime Minister's Office (PMO)

The Secretariat Building consists of two buildings: the North Block and the South Block. Both the buildings flank the Rashtrapati Bhavan.

 The South Block houses the PMO, MoD and the MEA.
 The North Block primarily houses the MoF and the MHA.

The terms 'North Block' and 'South Block' are often used to refer to the MoF and the MEA respectively.

The Secretariat Building was designed by the prominent British architect Herbert Baker. The building adopts elements from Rajputana styles of architecture. Examples include the use of Jali – decorated to protect from the scorching sun and monsoon rains of India. Another feature of the building is a dome-like structure known as the Chatri, a design unique to India, used in ancient times to give relief to travellers by providing shade from the hot Indian sun.

The style of architecture used in Secretariat Building is unique to Raisina Hill.

Organisation 
Cabinet Secretariat is organised as follows: Secretary (Coordination)  , Secretary (Security) (under whom comes the Special Protection Group) and Secretary (R) (heads Research and Analysis Wing;). Chairperson (National Authority for Chemical Weapons Convention), NIC Cell,   The Directorate of Public Grievances, Direct Benefits Transfer (DBT) Mission, Vigilance & Complaints Cell (VCC) is also under the Cabinet Secretariat.

Cabinet Secretary

The Cabinet Secretary is the ex-officio head of the Civil Services Board, the Cabinet Secretariat, the Indian Administrative Service (IAS) and head of all civil services under the rules of business of the Government.

The Cabinet Secretary is generally the senior-most officer of the Indian Administrative Service. The Cabinet Secretary ranks 11th on the Indian Order of Precedence. The Cabinet Secretary is under the direct charge of the Prime Minister. Though there is no fixed tenure, the office-bearer's tenure can be extended.

Before the adoption of the portfolio system in the Government of India, all governmental business was disposed of by the Governor-General-in Council (earlier name of Cabinet Secretariat), the Council functioning as a joint consultative board. As the amount and complexity of business of the Government increased, the work of the various departments was distributed amongst the members of the Council: only the more important cases were dealt with by the Governor-General or the Council collectively.

This procedure was legalised by the Councils Act of 1861, during the time of Lord Canning, leading to the introduction of the portfolio system and the inception of the Executive Council of the Governor-General. The Secretariat of the Executive Council was headed by the Cabinet Secretary.

The constitution of the Interim Government in September 1946 brought a change in the name, though little in functions, of this Office. The Executive Council's Secretariat was then designated as the Cabinet Secretariat. It seems, however, at least in retrospect, that Independence brought some change in the functions of the Cabinet Secretariat. It no longer remained concerned with only the passive work of circulating papers to Ministers and Ministries, but instead developed into an organisation for effecting coordination between the Ministries.

Prime Minister

The Cabinet Secretariat is under the direct charge of the Prime Minister. When any policy is made in the Cabinet Secretariat there must be signature of Prime Minister and Cabinet Secretary of India. The Prime Minister of India is the Head of the Union Government, as distinct from the President of India, who is the Head of State. Since India has parliamentary system of constitutional democracy, it is the Prime Minister who oversees the day-to-day functioning of the Union Government of India.

The Prime Minister is assisted in this task by his Council of Ministers, comprising Cabinet Ministers, Ministers of State with Independent Charge, Ministers of State who work with Cabinet Ministers, and Deputy Ministers.

Project Monitoring Group
In June 2013, a cell within the Cabinet Secretariat called the Project Monitoring Group was created to track stalled investment projects, both in the public and private sectors and to remove the implementation bottlenecks in these projects on a fast-track basis.

The Project Monitoring Group was moved to the Prime Minister's Office in 2014.

See also
 Rashtrapati Bhavan
 Rajpath

Notes

References

External links
 Government of India Cabinet Secretariat page
 Performance Management Division, Cabinet Secretariat page

Buildings and structures in Delhi
Government buildings in India
Indian government officials
Cabinet Secretariat of India